Hormonal sentience, first described by Robert A. Freitas Jr., describes the information processing rate in plants, which are mostly based on hormones instead of neurons like in all major animals (except sponges). Plants can to some degree communicate with each other and there are even examples of one-way-communication with animals.

Acacia trees produce tannin to defend themselves when they are grazed upon by animals. The airborne scent of the tannin is picked up by other acacia trees, which then start to produce tannin themselves as a protection from the nearby animals.
When attacked by caterpillars, some plants can release chemical signals to attract parasitic wasps that attack the caterpillars.

A similar phenomenon can be found not only between plants and animals, but also between fungi and animals. There exists some sort of communication between a fungus garden and workers of the leaf-cutting ant Atta sexdens rubropilosa. If the garden is fed with plants that are poisonous for the fungus, it signals this to the ants, which then will avoid fertilizing the fungus garden with any more of the poisonous plant.

The Venus flytrap, during a 1- to 20-second sensitivity interval, counts two stimuli before snapping shut on its insect prey, a processing peak of 1 bit/s. Mass is 10–100 grams, so the flytrap's SQ is about +1. Plants generally take hours to respond to stimuli though, so vegetative SQs (Sentience Quotient) tend to cluster around -2.

See also
Biosemiotics 
Phytosemiotics
Plant cognition
Plant perception (physiology)
:Category:Plant cognition

References

External links
Xenopsychology by Robert A. Freitas Jr.

Botany